Santiago Ramundo (born 10 May 1984) is an Argentine television actor, model and singer, also he graduated as a lawyer. He is best known for telenovelas as Sueña conmigo, Dulce amor and Entre caníbales.

Career 
His first appearance on television was in 2006 on the telenovela Tango del último amor, produced by TV Channel Russia and Telefe International, in the role of Esteban. In 2007 he personifies Ramiro Vázquez —character villain— in the telenovela  Son de Fierro. That same year he participated in the series Mujeres de nadie —in the role of Claudio Mendizabal— and participates in the play El caballero enduendado.

Filmography

References

External links 

Living people
1984 births
Argentine male telenovela actors
21st-century Argentine male actors
21st-century Argentine male singers
Argentine male models